Victor Whitham (12 February 1894–1962) was an English footballer who played in the Football League for Barnsley, Norwich City and Southend United.

References

1894 births
1962 deaths
English footballers
Association football forwards
English Football League players
Rotherham County F.C. players
Barnsley F.C. players
Norwich City F.C. players
Scunthorpe United F.C. players
Southend United F.C. players
Boston Town F.C. (1920s) players